The Shire of Katanning is a local government area in the Great Southern region of Western Australia, about  north of Albany and about  southeast of the state capital, Perth.

History
The Katanning Road District was gazetted on 18 May 1892. On 1 July 1961, it became a Shire following the passage of the Local Government Act 1960, which reformed all remaining road districts into shires.

Towns and localities
The towns and localities of the Shire of Katanning with population and size figures based on the most recent Australian census:

Notable councillors
 Frederick Piesse, Katanning Road Board member 1889–1896; later a state MP
 Wesley Maley, Katanning Road Board chairman 1898; later a state MP
 Arnold Piesse, Katanning Road Board chairman for 11 years; later a state MP
 Alec Thomson, Katanning Road Board member 1911–1915, chairman 1913; later a state MP

Heritage-listed places

As of 2023, 122 places are heritage-listed in the Shire of Katanning, of which 19 are on the State Register of Heritage Places.

References

Notes

Bibliography

External links
 

Katanning
Katanning, Western Australia